The Marais (Le Marais ; "the marsh") is a historic district in Paris, France. Having once been an aristocratic district, it is home to many buildings of historic and architectural importance. It spreads across parts of the 3rd and 4th arrondissements in Paris on the Rive Droite, or Right Bank, of the Seine. After a long period of decay the district has undergone a transformation in recent years and is now once again among the more fashionable areas of the city.

History

Paris aristocratic district

In 1240, the Knights Templar built a fortified church just outside the walls of Paris, in the northern part of the Marais. The Temple turned this district into an attractive area which became known as the Temple Quarter, and many religious institutions were built nearby: the convents des Blancs-Manteaux, de Sainte-Croix-de-la-Bretonnerie and des Carmes-Billettes, as well as the church of Sainte-Catherine-du-Val-des-Écoliers.

During the mid-13th century, Charles I of Anjou, King of Naples and Sicily, and brother of King Louis IX of France built his residence near the current n°7 rue de Sévigné. In 1361 the King Charles V built a mansion known as the Hôtel Saint-Pol, in which the Royal Court settled during his reign as well as his son's.

From that time to the 17th century and especially after the Royal Square (Place Royale, current place des Vosges) was designed under King Henri IV of France in 1605, the Marais was the favored place of residence for the French nobility. Among the many urban mansions—hôtels particuliers, in French—they built there were the Hôtel de Sens, the Hôtel de Sully, the Hôtel de Beauvais, the Hôtel Carnavalet, the Hôtel de Guénégaud and the Hôtel de Soubise.

During the late 18th century, the district was no longer considered the most fashionable district for the nobility, yet it still kept its reputation of being an aristocratic area. By that time, only minor nobles and a few higher ranking nobles, such as the Prince de Soubise, lived there. The Place des Vosges remained a place for nobles to meet. The district fell into disrepair after the French Revolution and was abandoned by the nobility completely. It would remain unfashionable until the late 20th century.

Jewish community

People

After the French Revolution, the district was no longer the aristocratic district it had been during the 17th and 18th centuries. Because of this, the district became a popular and active commercial area, hosting one of Paris' main Jewish communities. At the end of the 19th century and during the first half of the 20th, the district around the rue des Rosiers, referred to as the "Pletzl", welcomed many Eastern European Jews (Ashkenazi) who reinforced the district's clothing specialization. During World War II the Jewish community was targeted by the Nazis who were occupying France. As of today, the rue des Rosiers remains a major center of the Paris Jewish community, which has made a comeback since the 1990s. Public notices announce Jewish events, bookshops specialize in Jewish books, and numerous restaurants and other outlets sell kosher food.

Institutions
The synagogue on 10 rue Pavée is adjacent to the rue des Rosiers. It was designed in 1913 by Art Nouveau architect Hector Guimard, who designed several Paris Metro stations. The Marais houses the Museum of Jewish Art and History, the largest French museum of Jewish art and history. The museum conveys the extensive history and culture of Jews in Europe and North Africa from the Middle Ages to the 20th century.

Terrorist attack
In 1982, Palestinian extremists murdered 6 people and injured 22 at a Jewish restaurant in the Marais, Chez Jo Goldenberg, an attack which evidenced ties to the Abu Nidal Organization.

Post-war rehabilitation

By the 1950s, the district had become a working-class area and most of its architectural masterpieces were in a state of neglect. In 1964, General de Gaulle's Culture Minister, Andre Malraux, made the Marais the first secteur sauvegardé (literally translated as safeguarded sector). That was meant to protect and conserve places deemed to be of special cultural significance. In the following decades, the government and the city led an active restoration and Rehabilitation Policy.

The main hôtels particuliers have been restored and turned into museums: the Hôtel Salé hosts the Picasso Museum, the Hôtel Carnavalet hosts the Paris Historical Museum, the Hôtel Donon hosts the Cognacq-Jay Museum, the Hôtel de Saint-Aignan hosts the Musée d'Art et d'Histoire du Judaïsme. The site of Beaubourg, the western part of Marais, was chosen for the Centre Georges Pompidou, France's national Museum of Modern Art, which is widely considered one of the world's most important cultural institutions. The building was completed in 1977 with advanced modern architectural features by Renzo Piano and Richard Rogers.

Today's Marais

The Marais is now one of Paris' most frequented localities for art galleries. Following its restoration, the Marais has become a popular and culture-defining district, home to many upscale restaurants, fashion houses, and galleries.

The Marais is also known for its Chinese community. The community began to form during World War I. At that time, France needed workers on the home front to perform the duties previously filled by men who were now soldiers on the front lines. China sent a few thousand of its citizens, on the condition that they would not take part in the war. After the 1918 Allied victory, some of them stayed in Paris, living around the current rue au Maire. Today, most work in jewellery and leather-related products. The Marais' Chinese community has settled in the north of the district, particularly in the surrounding of Place de la République. Next to it, on the Rue du Temple, is the Chinese Church of Paris.

Other features of the neighborhood include the Musée Picasso, the house of Nicolas Flamel, the Musée Cognacq-Jay, and the Musée Carnavalet.

LGBT culture
The Marais became a center of LGBT culture, beginning in the 1980s. Florence Tamagne, author of Paris: 'Resting on its Laurels'?, wrote that the Marais "is less a 'village' where one lives and works than an entrance to a pleasure area" and that this differentiates it from Anglo-American gay villages. Tamagne added that like US gay villages, the Marais has "an emphasis on 'commercialism, gay pride and coming-out of the closet'". Le Dépôt, one of the largest cruising bars in Europe as of 2014 (per Tamagne), is in the Marais area.

Notable residents

 Maximilien de Béthune, duc de Sully†
 Urbain de Maillé-Brézé†
 Armand de Vignerot du Plessis†
 Princes of Rohan Soubise
 Catherine de Vivonne, marquise de Rambouillet†
 Marie de Rabutin-Chantal, marquise de Sévigné†
 Maximilien Robespierre†
 Victor Hugo†
 John Galliano
 Jacques Frémontier†
 Jack Lang
 Dominique Strauss-Kahn and Anne Sinclair
 Jim Morrison†

Places and monuments of note

 National Archives, including the Hôtel de Soubise and Hôtel de Rohan
 Carnavalet Museum
 Church Notre-Dame-des-Blancs-Manteaux
 Church of St-Gervais-et-St-Protais
 Church Saint-Merri
 Church of Saint-Nicolas-des-Champs
 Church of Saint-Paul-Saint-Louis
 Hôtel d'Angoulême Lamoignon (housing the Bibliothèque Historique de la Ville de Paris and the Hôtel-Lamoignon - Mark Ashton Garden.
 Hôtel d'Aumont
 Hôtel de Beauvais
 Hôtel de Sens
 Hôtel de Sully
 Place des Vosges, including the home of Victor Hugo and Café Ma Bourgogne
 Maison européenne de la photographie in the Hôtel de Camtobre (1706)
 Mémorial de la Shoah, including the Memorial of the Unknown Jewish Martyr and the CDJC
 Musée Cognacq-Jay
 Musée d'Art et d'Histoire du Judaïsme (housed in the Hôtel de Saint-Aignan)
 Musée des Arts et Métiers
 Musée Picasso
 Place des Émeutes-de-Stonewall (Stonewall riots square)
 Place Harvey Milk
 Pletzl, the historic Jewish quarter
 Rosiers – Joseph Migneret Garden
 Temple du Marais

Gallery

See also
 LGBT culture in Paris
 Musée Picasso
 Musée d'Art et d'Histoire du Judaïsme
 History of the Jews in France
 Musée Carnavalet
 Rue Beautreillis
 Rue des Rosiers
 Goldenberg restaurant attack

References

Further reading
 
 Sibalis, Michael. "Urban Space and Homosexuality: The Example of the Marais, Paris' 'Gay Ghetto'" (Wilfrid Laurier University). Urban Studies. August 2004 vol. 41 no. 9 p. 1739-1758. DOI 10.1080/0042098042000243138.

External links

 Le Marais
 Le Marais: The Indifferent Ghetto  Article about the Marais as the gay neighbourhood of Paris
 Gay Paris: English speaking gay walks in Paris
 ParisMarais.com: the official guide, partner of the Paris Tourist Office
 Le Marais photos
 Marais district Photographs
 My Gay Paris The latest news on Paris and the Marais with a gay perspective

3rd arrondissement of Paris
4th arrondissement of Paris
Marais, le
Marais, le
Entertainment districts in France
Gay villages in France
Marais, le
Marais, le
LGBT culture in Paris
Tourist attractions in Paris